Clare of Assisi (born Chiara Offreduccio and sometimes spelled Clara, Clair, Claire, Sinclair; 16 July 1194 – 11 August 1253) was an Italian saint and one of the first followers of Francis of Assisi. She founded the Order of Poor Ladies, a monastic religious order for women in the Franciscan tradition, and wrote their Rule of Life, the first set of monastic guidelines known to have been written by a woman. Following her death, the order she founded was renamed in her honour as the Order of Saint Clare, commonly referred to today as the Poor Clares. Her feast day is on 11 August.

Life 

Clare was born in Assisi to the Offreduccio household during the High Middle Ages, the eldest daughter of Favarone or Favorino Sciffi, Count of Sasso-Rosso and his wife Ortolana. Traditional accounts say that Clare's father was a wealthy representative of an ancient Roman family, who owned a large palace in Assisi and a castle on the slope of Mount Subasio. Ortolana belonged to the noble family of Fiumi, and was a very devout woman who had undertaken pilgrimages to Rome, Santiago de Compostela and the Holy Land. Later in life, Ortolana entered Clare's monastery, as did Clare's sisters, Beatrix and Catarina (who took the name Agnes and was later declared a saint herself).

As a child, Clare was devoted to prayer. Although there is no mention of this in any historical record, it is assumed that Clare was to be married in line with the family tradition. However, as a teen she heard Francis preach during a Lenten service in the church of San Giorgio at Assisi and asked him to help her to live after the manner of the Gospel. On the evening of Palm Sunday, 20 March 1212, she left her father's house and accompanied by her aunt Bianca and another companion proceeded to the chapel of the Porziuncula to meet Francis. There, her hair was cut, and she exchanged her rich gown for a plain robe and veil.

Francis placed Clare in the convent of the Benedictine nuns of San Paulo, near Bastia. Her father attempted to force her to return home. She clung to the altar of the church and threw aside her veil to show her cropped hair. She resisted each attempt, professing that she would have no other husband but Jesus Christ. In order to provide the greater solitude Clare desired, a few days later Francis sent her to Sant' Angelo in Panzo, another monastery of the Benedictine nuns on one of the flanks of Subasio. Clare was soon joined by her sister Catarina, who took the name Agnes. They remained with the Benedictines until a small dwelling was built for them next to the church of San Damiano, which Francis had repaired some years earlier.
Other women joined them, and they were known as the "Poor Ladies of San Damiano". They lived a simple life of poverty, austerity and seclusion from the world, according to a Rule which Francis gave them as a Second Order (Poor Clares).

San Damiano became the centre of Clare's new religious order, which was known in her lifetime as the "Order of Poor Ladies of San Damiano". San Damiano is traditionally considered the first house of this order; it may have been affiliated with an existing network of women's religious houses organised by Hugolino (who later became Pope Gregory IX). Hugolino wanted San Damiano as part of the order he founded because of the prestige of Clare's monastery. San Damiano emerged as the most important house in the order, and Clare became its undisputed leader. By 1263, just ten years after Clare's death, the order had become known as the Order of Saint Clare.

In 1228, when Gregory IX offered Clare a dispensation from the vow of strict poverty, she replied: "I need to be absolved from my sins, but not from the obligation of following Christ." Accordingly, the Pope granted them the Privilegium Pauperitatis — that nobody could oblige them to accept any possession.

Unlike the Franciscan friars, whose members moved around the country to preach, Saint Clare's sisters lived in enclosure, since an itinerant life was hardly conceivable at the time for women. Their life consisted of manual labour and prayer. The nuns went barefoot, slept on the ground, ate no meat and observed almost complete silence.

For a short period, the order was directed by Francis himself. Then in 1216, Clare accepted the role of abbess of San Damiano. As abbess, Clare had more authority to lead the order than when she was the prioress and required to follow the orders of a priest heading the community. Clare defended her order from the attempts of prelates to impose a rule on them that more closely resembled the Rule of Saint Benedict than Francis' stricter vows. Clare sought to imitate Francis' virtues and way of life so much so that she was sometimes titled alter Franciscus, another Francis. She also played a significant role in encouraging and aiding Francis, whom she saw as a spiritual father figure, and she took care of him during his final illness.

After Francis's death, Clare continued to promote the growth of her order, writing letters to abbesses in other parts of Europe and thwarting every attempt by each successive pope to impose a rule on her order which weakened the radical commitment to corporate poverty she had originally embraced. Clare's Franciscan theology of joyous poverty in imitation of Christ is evident in the rule she wrote for her community and in her four letters to Agnes of Prague.

As Holy Roman Emperor Frederick II battled Pope Gregory IX for control of Italy during the Crusades era, separately in September 1240 and June 1241, a pair of armies attacked the monastery of San Damiano and the town of Assisi. Both targets were successfully defended as Clare prayed to Christ, present in the Blessed Sacrament.

In her later years, Clare endured a long period of poor health. She died on 11 August 1253 at the age of 59. Her last words are reported to have been, "Blessed be You, O God, for having created me."

Death 

On 9 August 1253, two days before her death, the papal bull Solet annuere of Pope Innocent IV confirmed that Clare's rule would serve as the governing rule for Clare's Order of Poor Ladies. Her remains were interred at the chapel of San Giorgio while a church to hold her remains was being constructed. At her funeral, Pope Innocent IV insisted the friars perform the Office for the Virgin Saints as opposed to the Office for the Dead. This move by Pope Innocent ensured that the canonization process for Clare would begin shortly after her funeral. Pope Innocent was cautioned by multiple advisers against having the Office for the Virgin Saints performed at Clare's funeral. The most vocal of these advisers was Cardinal Raynaldus who would later become Pope Alexander IV, who in two years time would canonize Clare. At Pope Innocent's request the canonization process for Clare began immediately. While the whole process took two years, the examination of Clare's miracles took just six days. On 26 September 1255, Pope Alexander IV canonized Clare as Saint Clare of Assisi. Construction of the Basilica of Saint Clare was completed in 1260, and on 3 October of that year Clare's remains were transferred to the newly completed basilica where they were buried beneath the high altar. In further recognition of the saint, Pope Urban IV officially changed the name of the Order of Poor Ladies to the Order of Saint Clare in 1263.

Some 600 years later in 1872, Clare's relics were transferred to a newly constructed shrine in the crypt of the Basilica of Saint Clare, where her relics can still be venerated today.

Legacy 

Clare was canonized on 26 September 1255 by Pope Alexander IV, and her feast day was immediately inserted in the General Roman Calendar for celebration on 12 August, the day after her death, as 11 August was already assigned to Saints Tiburtius and Susanna, two 3rd-century Roman martyrs. The celebration was ranked as a Double (as in the Tridentine Calendar) or, in the terminology adopted in 1960, a Third-Class Feast (as in the General Roman Calendar of 1960). The 1969 calendar revision removed the feast of Tiburtius and Susanna from the calendar, finally allowing the memorial of Saint Clare to be celebrated on 11 August, the day of her death.

Construction of the Basilica di Santa Chiara began a year after Clare's canonization, and her remains were transferred there on 3 October 1260 from the church of St George, also in Assisi. Her bones are now in the crypt at the Basilica, having been rediscovered in 1850.

In art, Clare is often shown carrying a monstrance or pyx, in commemoration of the occasion when she warded away the invading soldiers of Frederick II at the gates of her convent by displaying the Blessed Sacrament and kneeling in prayer.

Pope Pius XII designated Clare as the patron saint of television in 1958 on the basis that when she was too ill to attend Mass, she had reportedly been able to see and hear it on the wall of her room.

There are traditions of bringing offerings of eggs to the Poor Clares for their intercessions for good weather, particularly for weddings. This tradition remains popular in the Philippines, particularly at the Real Monasterio de Santa Clara in Quezon City and in the town of Obando, Bulacan. According to the Filipino essayist Alejandro Roces, the practice arose because of Clare's name. In Castilian clara refers to an interval of clear weather, and also to the white or albumen of the egg.

Many places, including churches, convents, schools, hospitals, towns, and counties are named for Saint Clare, Santa Clara, or other variants. Lake Saint Clair between Lake Erie and Michigan was navigated and named on her feast day in 1679. The Saint Clair River, St. Clair Shores, Michigan, and St. Clair County, Michigan were also consequently named for her.

Mission Santa Clara, founded by Spanish missionaries in northern California in 1777, has given its name to the university, city, county and valley in which it sits, nicknamed "Silicon Valley" since the 1970s. Southern California's Santa Clara River is hundreds of miles to the south and gave its name to the nearby city of Santa Clarita. The early California missions were founded by Franciscan Friars, who had a special devotion to Saint Clare. Santa Clara Pueblo, New Mexico, celebrates its Santa Clara Feast Day annually on 12 August, as the feast was celebrated before the 1969 calendar change.

The first convent in Cuba, Convento de Santa Clara de Asis, was dedicated to Saint Clare, as well as her namesake city and its cathedral, Catedral de Santa Clara de Asís. Columbus's ship known as Niña, which visited Cuba twice, was officially named Santa Clara.

Clare is one of five characters in the oratorio Laudato si', composed in 2016 by Peter Reulein on a libretto by Helmut Schlegel, the others being an angel, Mary, Francis of Assisi and Pope Francis.

Clare of Assisi is remembered in the Church of England and other churches of the Anglican Communion with a Lesser Festival on 11 August.

See also 
 Saint Clare of Assisi, patron saint archive

References

Citations

Sources

Further reading 

 Acta Sanctorum, August II (in Latin), 1867 [orig. 1735]. pp. 739–768.
 Armstrong, Regis J. (ed. and trans.). The Lady: Clare of Assisi: Early Documents, 3rd ed. New York: New City Press, 2006 [orig. 1216–1260]. 
 Brady, Kathleen. Francis and Clare: The Struggles of the Saints of Assisi. New York: Lodwin Press, 2021 
 Caxton, William. The Life of the Holy Virgin St. Clare. Fordham University, 2000 [orig. 1483].
 Fiege, Marianus. The princess of poverty: Saint Clare of Assisi and the Order of Poor Ladies, 2nd ed. Evansville, Indiana: Poor Clares of the Monastery of Saint Clare, 1909.
 The Roman Breviary, III. Edinburgh: W. Blackwood, 1908 [orig. 1570]. pp. 815–816.
 Thomas of Celano (attributed). The Life of Saint Clare. Translated by Paschal Robinson. Philadelphia: Dolphin Press, 1910 [orig. c. 1258].

External links 

  – Nine windows depicting the Life of Clare, with detailed narratives by an abbess from her religious order.

1194 births
1253 deaths
13th-century Christian saints
Pre-Reformation Anglican saints
Franciscan mystics
Founders of Catholic religious communities
Franciscan spirituality
Franciscan saints
Italian Roman Catholic saints
People from Assisi
Poor Clare abbesses
Poor Clares
Female saints of medieval Italy
13th-century Italian Roman Catholic religious sisters and nuns
13th-century Christian mystics
Anglican saints
Women founders